Brandvlei is a small town in the Karoo region of the Northern Cape, South Africa. This is where a 19th-century trekboer called Ou Brand settled. Brand camped at this spot at the Sakrivier, a dry river bed, which only occasionally had water after good rains – and which typically result in flash floods. The settlement was cut in two by such a flood in 1961. After it was recovered, a municipality was formed in 1962.

This Brandvlei is located in the Bushmanland, also known as the Thirst Land, Dorsland in Afrikaans and should not be confused with the Brandvlei south of Worcester in the Western Cape. From 1974 until 2005 it was the location of an entire Long Range Artillery Battalion of the SADF, co-located with a Helicopter Transport Squadron and a Ground Attack Jet Squadron of the SAAF

This area was once sub-tropical, such as during the Miocene period. Many fossils have that been found in the area attest to this fact. From 1910 the farmers used an irrigation method comparable to one used for thousands of years by the Egyptians. The surface is very flat, and water does not run away easily. This way the rainwater is spread over a larger area and are allowed to sink into the soil. The moisture in the area is enough to farm with crops on a very small scale. Farmers live on these crops once the rains have gone. On the long run this method is not feasible, as evaporating water leaves behind salt and other minerals. Today this method is no longer used.

This region contains very little vegetation, primarily very low shrubs and yellow grass among a rocky desert kind of landscape. If you travel north from Brandvlei towards Kenhardt, you will pass through a huge landscape of nothingness for the next 200 km and more. During the seasons many birds flock to the pans, when they contain water, after some rainfall. Temperature above 40 °C is not uncommon.

Activities
Birdlife
The salt pans are renovated into bird sanctuaries after the summer rains.

Dutch Reformed Church
Visit the old Dutch Reformed Church, in Neo-Gothic style.

Lekkerlê and Kans
Two farms exhibiting splendid displays of San rock engravings.

Verneukpan
In 1929, Sir Malcolm Campbell unsuccessfully attempted to break the world land-speed record here by travelling over 300 mph in his Napier-Campbell Blue Bird.

Paragliding
In 1993 the record set for greatest gain in height was set in Brandvlei (4526m). The Karoo area is very thermic and has claimed multiple paragliding world records over the years.

See also

 Kenhardt, Northern Cape
 List of cities and towns in the Northern Cape
 Northern Cape
 Verneukpan

References

Populated places in the Hantam Local Municipality
Populated places established in 1862
Karoo
1862 establishments in the Cape Colony